is a former Japanese football player and manager. He played for Japan national team.

Club career
Sugiyama was born in Shizuoka on July 4, 1941. After graduating from Meiji University, he joined Japan Soccer League club Mitsubishi Motors in 1966. The club won the champion in 1969 and 1973. The club also won 1971 and 1973 Emperor's Cup. He retired in 1973. In his 8 seasons, he played all matches except 1 game in 1970 season and he was selected Best Eleven in all seasons. He was also selected Japanese Footballer of the Year 3 times (1964, 1969 and 1973).

National team career
On May 28, 1961, during Rōnin for university, Sugiyama debuted for Japan national team against Malaya. He played at 1964 Summer Olympics in Tokyo and 1968 Summer Olympics in Mexico City. At 1964 Summer Olympics, he played 3 games and scored 2 goals against Argentina and Ghana. At 1968 Summer Olympics, he played 6 matches and assisted 5 goals and Japan won bronze medal. In 2018, this team was selected Japan Football Hall of Fame. He also played at 1962, 1966 and 1970 Asian Games. At 1972 Summer Olympics qualification in 1971, Japan's failure to qualify for 1972 Summer Olympics. This qualification was his last game for Japan. He played 56 games and scored 15 goals for Japan until 1971.

Coaching career
After retirement, Sugiyama became a manager for Yamaha Motors in 1974. He led the club to the Japan Soccer League Division 1. He is their longest-serving manager, having led the club from 1974 to 1987.

In 2005, Sugiyama was selected Japan Football Hall of Fame.

Club statistics

National team statistics

National team goals

Awards
 Japanese Football Player of the Year: (3) 1964, 1969, 1973
 Japan Soccer League Best Eleven: (8) 1966, 1967, 1968, 1969, 1970, 1971, 1972, 1973
 Japan Soccer League Silver Ball (Assist Leader): (3) 1968, 1969, 1971

References

External links

 
 Japan National Football Team Database
Japan Football Hall of Fame at Japan Football Association
Japan Football Hall of Fame (Japan team at 1968 Olympics) at Japan Football Association

1941 births
Living people
Meiji University alumni
Association football people from Shizuoka Prefecture
Japanese footballers
Japan international footballers
Japan Soccer League players
Urawa Red Diamonds players
Olympic footballers of Japan
Olympic bronze medalists for Japan
Olympic medalists in football
Medalists at the 1968 Summer Olympics
Footballers at the 1964 Summer Olympics
Footballers at the 1968 Summer Olympics
Asian Games medalists in football
Asian Games bronze medalists for Japan
Footballers at the 1962 Asian Games
Footballers at the 1966 Asian Games
Footballers at the 1970 Asian Games
Japanese football managers
Júbilo Iwata managers
Association football forwards
Medalists at the 1966 Asian Games